Nicholas John White  (born 13 March 1951) is a British medical doctor and researcher, specializing in tropical medicine in developing countries. He is known for his work on tropical diseases, especially malaria using artemisinin-based combination therapy.

Biography
White studied medicine at the Guy's Hospital Medical School at King's College London. He completed his residency in internal medicine at various hospitals in London and at the Radcliffe Infirmary in Oxford. Since 1980, he has been part of a scientific collaboration (Mahidol Oxford Research Unit) between the faculty of Mahidol University in Thailand and the Nuffield Department of Medicine of the University of Oxford. Since 1986 he has been the director of this department and has opened similar collaborations with Vietnam (1991) and Laos (1999). These collaborations are dedicated to research on tropical diseases such as malaria, melioidosis, typhoid fever, tetanus, dengue fever, rickettsiosis, and tropical outbreaks of influenza.

White was appointed an Officer of the Order of the British Empire (OBE) in 1999. He was awarded the GlaxoSmithKline Prize in 2005 and was elected a Fellow of the Royal Society in 2006. In 2010, White received both the John Dirks Canada Gairdner Global Health Award and the Prince Mahidol Award. In 2017 he was appointed a Knight Commander of the Order of St Michael and St George (KCMG).

White is the author or coauthor of more than 1000 scientific publications. His h-index is 164 (as of May 2018).
He is married and has three children and six house chickens.

References

External links
  Professor Sir Nicholas J White FRS  at the Nuffield Department of Medicine (ndm.ox. ac.uk)
 

20th-century English medical doctors
21st-century English medical doctors
Academics of the University of Oxford
British medical researchers
British tropical physicians
Fellows of the Royal Society
Knights Commander of the Order of St Michael and St George
Malariologists
Manson medal winners
Officers of the Order of the British Empire
1951 births
Living people
Members of the National Academy of Medicine